Nationality words link to articles with information on the nation's poetry or literature (for instance, Irish or France).

Events
 February 1 – First broadcast on Sveriges Radio (Sweden) of the continuing programme Dagens dikt ("Poem of the day").
  Summer – In Nazi Germany, Wolfgang Willrich, a member of the SS, lampoons German expressionist poet Gottfried Benn in his book Säuberung des Kunsttempels; Heinrich Himmler, however, steps in to reprimand Willrich and defends Benn on the grounds of his pro-Nazi record since 1933 (his earlier artistic output being dismissed as irrelevant).
 Iowa Writers' Workshop is founded by Paul Engle at the University of Iowa
 George Hill Dillon becomes editor of Poetry Magazine, remaining in that post until 1949.
 Poems of colonial American pastor Edward Taylor (d. 1729) are first discovered and published.
 W. B. Yeats concludes his recordings of his own verse and his broadcast lectures on the BBC (begun in 1936).

Works published in English

Canada
Wilson MacDonald, Comber Cove. Toronto: S.J.R. Saunders.
E. J. Pratt, The Fable of the Goats and Other Poems, Toronto: Macmillan. Governor General's Award 1937.

India, in English
 Harindranath Chattopadhyaya, Strange Journey ( Poetry in English ), Madras: Shakti Karyalayam
 P. R. Kaikini, This Civilization ( Poetry in English ), Bombay: New Book Co.
 Iqbal Ali Shah, editor, The Coronation Book of Oriental Literature ( Poetry in English ), London: Sampson Low, Marston and Co., 404 pages; anthology; Indian poetry published in the United Kingdom

United Kingdom
 W. H. Auden, Spain
 W. H. Auden and Louis MacNeice, Letters from Iceland, partly poetry
 George Barker, Calamiterror
 John Betjeman, Continual Dew: A little book of bourgeois verse, including "The Arrest of Oscar Wilde at the Cadogan Hotel"
 Edmund Blunden, A Ballad of Titles, An elegy, and other poems and Uneasy Quiet
 Walter de la Mare, This Year, Next Year, illustrations by Harold Jones, Faber
 David Jones, In Parenthesis, frontispiece by author, Faber
 Charles Madge, The Disappearing Castle
 Edwin Muir, Journeys and Places
 Enoch Powell, First Poems, Oxford: Blackwell
 Isaac Rosenberg, Collected Works, foreword by Siegfried Sassoon; posthumously published
 Iqbal Ali Shah, editor, The Coronation Book of Oriental Literature, London: Sampson Low, Marston and Co., 404 pages; anthology; Indian poetry in English, published in the United Kingdom
 Stevie Smith, A Good Time Was Had By All

United States
 W. H. Auden, with Louis MacNeice, Letters from Iceland
 R. P. Blackmur, From Jordan's Delight
 Louise Bogan, the Sleeping Fury
 Richard Eberhart, Reading the Spirit
 Robert Hillyer, A Letter to Robert Frost and Others
 Robinson Jeffers, Such Counsels You Gave to Me
 Josephine Johnson, Year's End
 Edna St. Vincent Millay, Conversation at Midnight
 Ezra Pound, The Fifth Decad of Cantos

 May Sarton, Encounter in April
 Dr. Seuss, And to Think That I Saw It on Mulberry Street, the author's first book; for children
 Wallace Stevens, The Man with the Blue Guitar, and Other Poems, includes "The Man With the Blue Guitar," "A Thought Revolved," and "The Men That Are Falling", Knopf
 Allen Tate, Selected Poems

Other in English
 Allen Curnow, Enemies: Poems 1934–36 (Caxton), New Zealand
 Robin Hyde, Wednesday's Children, New Zealand
 Seaforth Mackenzie, Our Earth, Sydney: Angus and Robertson; Australia

Works published in French

Canada
 Hector de Saint-Denys Garneau, Regards et jeux dans l'espace

France
 Jacques Audiberti, Race des hommes
 Rene-Guy Cadou, Les Brancardiers de l'aube, the author's first book of poems, published when he was 17 years old
 Pierre Jean Jouve, Matière celeste
 Max Jacob, Morceaux choisis
 Oscar Vladislas de Lubicz-Milosz, also known as O. V. de L. Milosz, Dix-sept Poèmes de Milosz
 Henri Michaux, Plume, précédé de Lointain intérieur
 Pierre Reverdy, Ferraille
 Philippe Soupault, Poésies Complètes 1917–1973

Works published in other languages

Indian subcontinent
Including all of the British colonies that later became India, Pakistan, Bangladesh, Sri Lanka and Nepal. Listed alphabetically by first name, regardless of surname:

Bengali
 Mallavarapu Visveswara Rao, Madukila, notable for its style, sentiments and various metrics
 Rabindranath Tagore:
 Khapchada, short, humorous and frivolous poems in the style of nursery rhymes
 Chadar Chabi
 Samar Sen, Kayekti Kabita, Indian, Bengali-language
 Sudhindranath Dutta, Krandasi

Telugu
 Gangula Sayi Reddi, Kapu bidda, poems on the condition of farmers; Telugu
 Gurram Jashuva, editor, Khanda Kavyamu or Jashuva Khandakavyalu, in seven volumes, published from this year to 1949; anthology of Telagu poetry
 Peer Aziz Ullah Haqqani, Qissa-e-Mumtaz E Benazir, a large masnavi of Romantic mysticism; Telugu; posthumous
 Srirangam arayanababu, Rudhirajyoti, Telugu
 Vedula Satyanarayan Shastri, Dipavali, romantic lyrics, Telugu

Urdu
 Mehr Lal Soni Zia Fatehabadi Noor-e-Mashriq (The Light of the East) - Collection of nazms, geets and sonnets  published by Jyoti Prasad Gupta, Jyoti Printing Works, Esplanade, Delhi in 1937.

Other Indian languages
 Anupa Sharma, Siddharth, a Hindi epic in 18 chapters on the story of Gautama Buddha
 D. R. Bendre, also known as Ambikatanaya Datta, Sakhigita, the title poem is autobiographical; Kannada
 Devandas Kishinani, 'Purab Sandes, Indian, Sindhi-language
 Ghulam Mohammad Hanafi, Jang-e Amir Hamza, a Jangnama, based on an episode in the movement to spread Islam; Kashmiri
 Hijam Anganhal Simha, Singel Indu, a long narrative Meitei poem
 Manjewshwara Govinda Pai, Golgotha, long narrative poem on the final days of Jesus Christ, Kannada
 Riddhinath Jha, Pravasi Mithiles, verses praising the Maharaja of Darbhanga;  Maithili
 Siyaramsharan Gupta, Bapu, on Gandhi and his ideology, Hindi

Spanish language

Peru
 Xavier Abril, Descubrimiento del alba
 José Santos Chocano, Poemas de amor doliente, Peru
 Manuel Moreno Jimeno, Así bajaron los perros
 Luis Fabio Xammar, Waino

Other in Spanish
 Miguel Hernández, Viento del pueblo; Spain

Other
 Amir Hamzah, Nyanyi Sunyi, Dutch East Indies

Awards and honors
 Queen's Gold Medal for Poetry: W. H. Auden
 Consultant in Poetry to the Library of Congress (the post which was later called "Poet Laureate Consultant in Poetry to the Library of Congress"): Joseph Auslander appointed this year (he would serve until 1941)
 Fellowship of the Academy of American Poets: Edwin Markham
 Governor General's Award, poetry or drama: The Fable of the Goats, E. J. Pratt

Births
Death years link to the corresponding "[year] in poetry" article:
 January 1:
 John Fuller, English poet and author
 Dilwar Khan (died 2013), Bengali poet
 January 14 – J. Bernlef, born Hendrik Jan Marsman (died 2012), Dutch poet, novelist and translator
 February 21 – Mervyn Morris, Jamaican poet
 February 27 – Peter Hamm (died 2019), German poet, author, journalist, editor and literary critic
 April 10 – Bella Akhmadulina (died 2010), Russian poet
 April 23 – Coleman Barks, American poet who, although he neither speaks nor reads Persian, is nonetheless renowned as a translator of Rumi and other mystic poets of Persia
 April 30 – Tony Harrison, English poet and playwright
 May 11 – Michael Heller, American poet
 May 21 – Glen Sorestad, Canadian poet
 June 8 – Gillian Clarke, native Welsh, English-language poet, playwright, editor, broadcaster, lecturer and translator (from Welsh)
 June 10 – Susan Howe, American poet and critic closely associated with the Language poets
 July 3 – Milovan Danojlić, Serbian poet and essayist (died 2022)
 July 10 – Kurt Bartsch, German poet
 July 29 – Eleanor Wilner, American poet and editor
 August 3
 Marvin Bell (died 2020), American poet
 Diane Wakoski, American poet associated with the "deep image" poets and the Beats
 September 14 – Douglas Oliver (died 2000), British poet
 October 11 – R. H. W. Dillard, American poet, author, critic and translator
 November 4 – W. Dabney Stuart, American poet
 November 9
 Roger McGough, English poet
 S. Abdul Rahman (died 2017), Tamil poet
 November 11 – Alicia Ostriker, American poet and academic
 November 19 – Meg Campbell (died 2007), New Zealand poet and wife of Alistair Campbell
 December 1 – Eugene B. Redmond, African-American poet
 December 31 – Nicolas Born (died 1979), German poet
 Also:
 Vénus Khoury-Ghata, Lebanese-born French poet, novelist and beauty queen
 Parijat, पारिजात, Bishnu Kumari Waiba (died 1993), Nepalese novelist and poet
 John Riley (died 1978), English poet associated with the British Poetry Revival

Deaths
Death years link to the corresponding "[year] in poetry" article:
 March 8 – Albert Verwey (born 1865), Dutch poet
 June 22 – Jean-Joseph Rabearivelo (born 1901?), Malagasy poet writing in French; suicide
 July 18 – Julian Bell (born 1908), English poet, and a member of a family whose notable members include his parents, Clive and Vanessa Bell; his aunt, Virginia Woolf; his younger brother, writer Quentin Bell; and his half-sister, writer and painter Angelica Garnett; killed in the Spanish Civil War
 August 11 – Edith Wharton (born 1862), American novelist, short story writer, designer and poet
 September 8 – Anna Hempstead Branch (born 1875), American poet
 October 22 – Chūya Nakahara 中原 中也 (born 1907), early Shōwa period Japanese poet (surname: Nakahara)
 December 26 – Ivor Gurney (born 1890), English composer and poet; tuberculosis while suffering delusional insanity
 December 29 – Don Marquis (born 1878), American poet, artist, newspaper columnist, humorist, playwright and author best known for creating the characters "Archy" and "Mehitabel"
 Also – Constance Woodrow (born 1899), English-born Canadian poet

See also

 Poetry
 List of poetry awards
 List of years in poetry

Notes

20th-century poetry